Seo Sang-min (Hanja: 徐相民; born July 25, 1986) is South Korean footballer who plays as a midfielder.

Club career
His first league match was the opening match of the 2008 K League for Gyeongnam against Daegu.

After a year away from football, Seo moved to Hong Kong club Hoi King on 28 September 2018. On 16 January 2019, he moved to another Hong Kong Premier League club Kitchee.

References

External links

Living people
1986 births
Footballers from Seoul
South Korean footballers
South Korean expatriate footballers
South Korean expatriate sportspeople in Hong Kong
Expatriate footballers in Hong Kong
Association football midfielders
Gyeongnam FC players
Jeonbuk Hyundai Motors players
Gimcheon Sangmu FC players
Suwon FC players
Hoi King SA players
Kitchee SC players
K League 1 players
K League 2 players
Hong Kong Premier League players